Kim You-ra, known mononymously as Youra, is a South Korean singer-songwriter signed under Mun Hwa In label. She made her debut as a solo artist on 1 October 2018, with her single, "My".

Musical career 
Youra debuted as a solo artist on 1 October 2018, with the song "My". She was a contestant on SBS program The Fan, where she advanced to the fourth round, lasting on eight position before being eliminated from the program.

On 5 March 2019, she released her first EP, named B Side. On 28 July 2020, she released the single "Virus Mix".

On 23 December 2020, she released the single "RAL 9002" (하양), featuring Heize.
On 2 February 2021, she released her second EP, named Gaussian, with "Mimi" as the lead single.

On 2 February 2021, she released a second EP titled 'GAUSSIAN'.

On 21 November 2022 she released her third EP titled 'The Vibe is a Chance'. A collaborative effort with Youra on vocals and the instrumentals performed by the band 'Mandong'.

Discography

Extended plays 
 B Side (2019)
 Gaussian (2021)
 The Vibe is a Chance (2022)

Digital singles

As main artist 
"My" (2018)
"Dot" (2020)
"행복은 도피여야 해" ("Happy") (2020)
"Virus Mix" (2020)
"하양" («RAL 9002») (2020, featuring Heize)
"Rawww" (2021)
"Best regards" (2022)
"Jungle Bike" (2022)

As featured artist 
 "나의 머리는 녹색 (My Hair Is Green)" (featuring 015B) (2018)
 "Can I Love?" (featuring Cosmic Boy and Meego) (2019)
 "팝콘 (Popcorn)" (featuring Aquinas and Penomeco) (2019)
 "나무 (Tree)" (featuring Car, the Garden) (2019)
 "Risk" (featuring Way Ched) (2019)
 "도쿄 (Towkio)" (featuring Giriboy) (2019)
 "Yay Yay Yay" (featuring Kirin) (2019)
 "염색 (Color)" (featuring GroovyRoom & Leellamarz) (2019)
 "Sadderday" (featuring Owen Ovadoz and Hyngsn) (2019)
 "Winter" (featuring Cosmic Boy) (2020)
 "인간중독 (Human Addict)" (featuring Leellamarz & Toil) (2020)
 "그래왔던것처럼 (Used To)" (featuring George (죠지) and Cosmic Boy) (2020)

Collaborations 
 "New Edition 03" (with 015B) (2018)
 "New Edition 13" (with 015B) (2019)

Soundtracks 
Into the Ring OST Part.2 - "New Direction" (2020)

Other releases 
"Carpet My Heart For You" (2018)
"수영해 (Swim)" (2019)
"You" (2019)

References

External links 

21st-century South Korean women singers
South Korean contemporary R&B singers
South Korean women singer-songwriters
Living people
People from Yeosu
1993 births